Lee Turnbull may refer to:
 Lee Turnbull (actor), English television and film actor 
 Lee Turnbull (footballer) (born 1967), English football player, manager, and scout